

Great Australian Bight Marine Park Whale Sanctuary was a marine protected area in the Australian state of South Australia located immediately off the coastline of the Great Australian Bight in waters about  west-northwest of the state capital of Adelaide.  

It was bounded by the Great Australian Bight Marine National Park to its immediate west and east and its extent included the bay known as the Head of Bight. It was also part of the group of marine protected areas which are located together in waters within Australian and South Australian jurisdictions within the Great Australian Bight and which is collectively known as the Great Australian Bight Marine Park. Since late 2012, both the whale sanctuary and the national park have also been within the boundaries of the Far West Coast Marine Park.  

The whale sanctuary was originally proclaimed as a marine park under the Fisheries Act 1982 (SA) by the South Australian Government on 22 June 1995 to protect waters used by Southern right whales for breeding and calving. It was re-classified as an aquatic reserve after the repeal of the Fisheries Act 1982 by the Fisheries Management Act 2007 (SA) in 2007.  It was abolished on 20 October 2016.

The whale sanctuary was classified as an IUCN Category Ia protected area.

See also
 Great Australian Bight Marine Park (2017) 
 Great Australian Bight Marine Park (Commonwealth waters)
 Whale watching in Australia

References 

Aquatic reserves of South Australia
Protected areas established in 1995
Protected areas disestablished in 2016
1995 establishments in Australia
2016 disestablishments in Australia
Former protected areas of South Australia
Great Australian Bight
Whale sanctuaries